Club Deportivo Clan Juvenil is an Ecuadorian professional football club based in Sangolquí. They currently play in the Serie A after gaining promotion from the Serie B.

Current squad

Honours
Serie B de Ecuador
Runner-up (1): 2016

Managers
 Juan Carlos Garay (2016–2017)
 Carlos Sevilla (2017–)

References
Clan Juvenil
Players

External links
Official Twitter 

Clan Juvenil
Association football clubs established in 1973
1973 establishments in Ecuador